Burry Port Rugby Football Club is a rugby union team from the village of Burry Port in West Wales. The club is a member of the Welsh Rugby Union and is a feeder club for the Llanelli Scarlets.

Club honours
 WRU Division Five West 2007/08 - Champions
2015/16 SSE Swalec bowl Champions

Notable former players
 Howard Davies (6 caps)
 Kirby Myhill (1 cap)
(rugby player) Rob Owens 
(rugby player) Arwyn 'rhino' Phillips ( 1 cap warriors)

References

Welsh rugby union teams
Burry Port